Trailing Trouble is a 1930 American Western film directed by Arthur Rosson, written by Harold Tarshis, and starring Hoot Gibson. It was released on March 23, 1930, by Universal Pictures. The title was also seen as Trailin' Trouble.

Cast 
Hoot Gibson as Ed King
Margaret Quimby as Molly Blake
William McCall as Pop Blake 
Pete Morrison as Buck Saunders
Bob Perry as Red Gillis
Olive Young as Ming Toy
Milton Brown as Sheriff
Mary Carr as Old Lady

Plot
Ed King and Buck Moran are rivals for the affections of Molly, daughter of the rancher for whom King works. When King takes horses to a sale, Moran arranges to have the sale money stolen. Initially, the rancher accuses King of theft, but the thief eventually returns the money and identifies Moran as the man behind the plot. King captures Moran and regains Molly's affections.

Production 
In addition to Rosson and Tarshis as director and writer, Carl Loemmle was the producer. Harry Neumann was the director of photography, Gilmore Walker was the film editor, and C. Roy Hunter was the recording engineer.

References

External links 
 

1930 films
1930s English-language films
American Western (genre) films
1930 Western (genre) films
Universal Pictures films
Films directed by Arthur Rosson
American black-and-white films
1930s American films